In the Library of Horrific Events is the second album by UK metalcore band, Johnny Truant, released on October 17, 2005 by Undergroove Records. It was produced by Adam Dutkiewicz of Killswitch Engage.

The album's themes are that of "love and loss, pain and hope and the tragic death of a close friend".

Track listing
All tracks written by Johnny Truant.
 "I Love You Even Though You're a Zombie Now" – 3:02
 "The Bloodening" – 4:03
 "Realist Surrealist" – 3:35
 "Dirty Vampire Feeding Frenzy" – 5:04
 "Throne Vertigo" – 2:53
 "Vultures" – 1:24
 "A Day in the Death" – 5:14
 "The Necropolis Junction" – 4:39
 "I, The Exploder" – 4:01
 "Footprints in the Thunder" – 5:39

Personnel

Band members

James Hunter – bass guitar
Stuart Hunter – guitars
Paul Jackson – drums
Olly Mitchell – vocals

Other personnel

Adam Dutkiewicz – production, mixing, mastering
Tank.Axe.Love – artwork, layout, album design

References

Johnny Truant albums
2005 albums
Undergroove Records albums
Albums produced by Adam Dutkiewicz
Dine Alone Records albums